Durmuş Yılmaz is a Turkish economist and was the Governor of the Central Bank of the Republic of Turkey between 2006 and 2011. He served as a Member of Parliament for the electoral district of Uşak since the June 2015 general election, as a politician from the Nationalist Movement Party (Turkish: Milliyetçi Hareket Partisi, MHP). He currently is the vice chairman specializing in economics of the newly-founded secular centrist Good Party.

Biography
Born in the western Anatolian city of Uşak in 1947, Yılmaz obtained a B.A. degree in economics at City University London and received his M.A. degree from the University College London.

Yılmaz joined the Central Bank of Turkey in 1980 and started to work in the Foreign Debt Rescheduling Division. Then he served in the area of Exchange Rates and Reserve Management. He was promoted to the post of Deputy Director of Foreign Exchange Transactions Division in 1993, Director of Interbank Money Market Division in 1995, and Director of Balance of Payments Division in 1996. Yılmaz became Deputy Executive Director at Markets Department in 1996 and was responsible for the Foreign Exchange Risk Management, Credits, Foreign Exchange and FX Banknotes Markets and Open Market Operations. He was appointed Executive Director of the Workers’ Remittances (Non-Resident FX Deposits) Department in 2002. Yılmaz became a Member of the Board on May 1, 2003, and re-elected to this position by April 2006.

Durmuş Yılmaz was appointed Governor of the Central Bank of the Republic of Turkey on April 18, 2006 following the approval of President Ahmet Necdet Sezer. One month before, Sezer rejected the government's first candidate for the post, Adnan Buyukdeniz, chief executive of AlBaraka Turk, an interest-free financial institution founded with Arab capital. The post of governorship was held by Erdem Başçı, an interim governor since March 14, 2006 when the widely respected Süreyya Serdengeçti retired at the end of a five-year term that saw chronic inflation drop from double- to single-digit figures for the first time in three decades under a tight program backed by the International Monetary Fund.

External links
Newspaper Dünya

References

1947 births
Living people
Turkish economists
Turkish civil servants
Governors of the Central Bank of Turkey
Alumni of University College London
Alumni of Bayes Business School
People from Uşak
Members of the 25th Parliament of Turkey
Good Party politicians